In South Asia, semi-classical music (Hindi: नीम क्लासिकी मौसीक़ी, Urdu: نیم کلاسیکی موسیقی; neem klaseeki moseeqi) is derived from Hindustani classical music that is often combined with filmi music.

It aired on Pakistan Television from 1964 (its establishment) to the late 1980s. Although, this music is still produced, it is not as frequent.

Historical background
After the Indian Rebellion of 1857 or sometimes also called the First war of independence from the British rule, most Mughal court musicians moved from Delhi to the relative peace and safety of smaller towns after the failure of the 1857 rebellion.

Thumri and Dadra
In those smaller towns, a new musical movement gained momentum which sought relaxation from the structural limitations of the khayal form of music to allow singers to express themselves with lighter music. This new trend resulted in the development of two closely related music genres, the thumri and the dadra.

After the independence of Pakistan in 1947, this musical heritage and many of the musicians shifted to Pakistan. Thumri and dadra have been and still are popular among contemporary classical vocalists in Pakistan.

Semi-classical singers
Ustad Bade Ghulam Ali Khan
Ustad Barkat Ali Khan
Ustad Salamat Ali Khan
Ustad Amanat Ali Khan and Bade Fateh Ali Khan
Atif Aslam
Hamid Ali Khan
Shafqat Amanat Ali
Iqbal Bano
Ghulam Ali (singer)
Farida Khanum
Suraiya Multanikar
Mehdi Hassan
Sajjad Ali
Lata Mangeshkar
Asha Bhosle

Other music

Pakistani pop music, despite starting as completely westernized music, has been heavily influenced by semi-classical by the passage of time.

References

Pakistani styles of music
Classical music in Pakistan